Jessica Dublin (July 9, 1918 – July 21, 2012) was an American actress who appeared in a number of Italian films.

Filmography

References

Bibliography 
 Pitts, Michael R. Western Movies: A Guide to 5,105 Feature Films. McFarland, 2012.

External links 
 

1918 births
2012 deaths
American film actresses
Actresses from New York City
20th-century American actresses
American expatriates in Italy
21st-century American women